Mundo De Cristo is an online Dominican magazine covering media, music, news, and Christian editorials. The website highlights Christian culture.

History 
Mundo De Cristo was created in 2010 by Luther Yonel, a fourteen-year-old missionary child born in the Dominican Republic. In 2014, they became one of the most visited religious pages at that time.

In 2015 they formed the team Equipo MDC.

References

External links 

  

Spanish-language websites
Christian websites